Jaan Vain (14 November 1886 Kõo Parish (now Põhja-Sakala Parish), Kreis Fellin – March 1942) was an Estonian lawyer and politician. He was a member of the I II III and V Riigikogu.

He was Second Assistant Secretary in II Riigikogu.

References

1886 births
1942 deaths
People from Põhja-Sakala Parish
People from Kreis Fellin
Estonian Social Democratic Workers' Party politicians
Estonian Socialist Workers' Party politicians
Members of the Estonian Constituent Assembly
Members of the Riigikogu, 1920–1923
Members of the Riigikogu, 1923–1926
Members of the Riigikogu, 1926–1929
Members of the Riigikogu, 1929–1932
Members of the Riigivolikogu
20th-century Estonian lawyers
University of Tartu alumni
Estonian military personnel of the Estonian War of Independence